Alicia Keys is an American singer-songwriter, pianist, and music producer. She was signed to Columbia Records at 15 years old, later leaving Columbia to sign with Arista Records and then J Records. Her debut album, Songs in A Minor, was released on June 5, 2001. For Songs in A Minor, Keys was nominated for six Grammy Awards, winning five, including Best R&B Album, Song of the Year for "Fallin'", and Best New Artist. Among other accolades, she also received two MTV Video Music Awards nominations, winning Best New Artist, six American Music Awards nominations, winning two, and eight Billboard Music Award nominations, winning Female Artist of the Year and New R&B/Hip-Hop Artist of the Year.

Keys' second album, The Diary of Alicia Keys, was released on December 2, 2003. For Diary, Keys received, among other accolades, Grammy Awards for Best R&B Album, Best Female R&B Vocal Performance for "If I Ain't Got You", Best R&B Song for "You Don't Know My Name", and Best R&B Performance by a Duo or Group with Vocals for "My Boo" (from eight nominations); Best R&B Female Artist at the BET Awards; and Female Artist of the Year, Hot 100 Songwriter of the Year, R&B/Hip-Hop Single of the Year for "If I Ain't Got You", and R&B/Hip-Hop Albums Artist of the Year at the Billboard Music Awards.

In 2006, Keys received 12 nominations and won 3, including Outstanding Female Artist, Outstanding song and Outstanding Music Video for "Unbreakable" at the NAACP Image Awards. In 2008, Keys received 30 nominations and won 16, including Best Album, Pop/Rock and Best Album, Soul/R&B for As I Am at the American Music Awards; Best Female R&B Vocal Performance and Best R&B Song for "No One" at the Grammy Awards and World's Best Selling R&B Artist at the World Music Awards.

American Music Awards
The American Music Awards are held annually to award the outstanding achievements of American artists in the record industry. Keys has won five awards from sixteen nominations.

|-
|rowspan="6"|2002
|Songs in A Minor
|Favorite Album, Soul/R&B
|
|-
|rowspan="6"|Alicia Keys
|Favorite Female Artist, Pop/Rock
|
|-
|Favorite New Artist, Pop/Rock
|
|-
|Favorite Female Artist, Soul/R&B
|
|-
|Favorite New Artist, Soul/R&B
|
|-
|Favorite Internet Artist
|
|-
|rowspan="2"|2004
|Favorite Female Artist, Soul/R&B 
|
|-
|The Diary of Alicia Keys
|Favorite Album, Soul/R&B 
|
|-
|rowspan="5"|2008
|rowspan="2"|As I Am
|Best Album, Pop/Rock
|
|-
|Best Album, Soul/R&B
|
|-
|rowspan="4"|Alicia Keys
|Artist of the Year
|
|-
|Favorite Female Artist, Pop/Rock
|
|-
|Favorite Female Artist, Soul/R&B
|
|-
|rowspan="2"|2010
|Favorite Female Artist, Soul/R&B
|
|-
|The Element of Freedom
|Best Album, Soul/R&B
|
|-
|2013
|Alicia Keys
|Favorite Female Artist
|

Artivist Awards

|-
|2013
|Alicia Keys
|Artivist Award
|

ASCAP Awards
The ASCAP Awards are held annually by the American Society of Composers, Authors and Publishers.

ASCAP Pop Awards
The ASCAP Pop Music Awards honors the songwriters and publishers of the most performed pop songs. Keys has won four awards.

|-
|2003
|"Fallin'"
|rowspan="4"|Most Performed Song
|
|-
|rowspan="2"|2005
|"If I Ain't Got You"
|
|-
|"You Don't Know My Name"
|
|-
|2009
|"No One"
|

ASCAP Rhythm & Soul Awards
The ASCAP Rhythm & Soul Music Awards honors songwriters and publishers of top R&B, hip hop, and reggae music. Keys has won eight awards, including one special award.

|-
|2002
|"Fallin'"
|Award Winning R&B/Hip-Hop Song
|
|-
|rowspan="2"|2005
|Alicia Keys
|Songwriter of the Year
|
|-
|"If I Ain't Got You"
|Top R&B/Hip-Hop Song of the Year
|
|-
|rowspan="4"|2009
|Alicia Keys
|Golden Note Award
|
|-
|"Like You'll Never See Me Again"
|Top R&B/Hip-Hop Song of the Year
|
|-
|"No One"
|Ascap R&B/Hip-Hop Award
|
|-
|"Teenage Love Affair"
|Ascap R&B/Hip-Hop Award
|
|-
|2014
|"Girl on Fire"
|Award Winning R&B/Hip-Hop Song
|

BCG Awards
Keys has received four nominations.

|-
|2012
|Alicia Keys – Keep A Child Alive Foundation
|Celebrity Giver of the Year
|
|-
|rowspan="3"|2015
|Alicia Keys – Black Ball
|Best Charity Event of the Year
|
|-
|#WeAreHere
|BCG Best Cause Campaign of the Year
|
|-
|Alicia Keys
|BCG Celebrity Giver of the Year
|

BEFFTA Awards
The Black Entertainment, Film, Fashion, Television and Arts (BEFFTA) Awards celebrate and reward the achievements of the known and unknown black personalities within entertainment, film, fashion, television and arts. Keys has received three nominations.

|-
|2010
|rowspan="3"|Alicia Keys
|rowspan="3"|Best International Act
|
|-
|2014
|
|-
|2016
|

Billboard Awards

Billboard Music Awards
The Billboard Music Awards are held to honor artists for commercial performance in the United States based on record charts published by Billboard. Keys has won nine awards from twenty-seven nominations.

|-
|rowspan="8"|2001
|"Fallin'"
|Hot 100 Single of the Year
|
|-
|Songs in A Minor
|R&B/Hip-Hop Album of the Year
|
|-
|rowspan="10"|Alicia Keys
|Female Artist of the Year
|
|-
|New Artist of the Year
|
|-
|Female Albums Artist of the Year
|
|-
|Female Hot 100 Singles Artist of the Year
|
|-
|Female R&B/Hip-Hop Artist of the Year
|
|-
|New R&B/Hip-Hop Artist of the Year
|
|-
|rowspan="13"|2004
|Artist of the Year
|
|-
|Female Artist of the Year
|
|-
|Hot 100 Artist of the Year
|
|-
|Hot 100 Songwriter of the Year
|
|-
|rowspan="2"|The Diary of Alicia Keys
|R&B/Hip-Hop Album of the Year
|
|-
|Billboard 200 Album of the Year
|
|-
|rowspan="2"|"If I Ain't Got You"
|R&B/Hip-Hop Single of the Year
|
|-
|R&B/Hip-Hop Airplay Single of the Year
|
|-
|"Diary"
|R&B/Hip-Hop Airplay Single of the Year
|
|-
|rowspan="6"|Alicia Keys
|R&B/Hip-Hop Albums Artist of the Year
|
|-
|R&B/Hip-Hop Artist of the Year
|
|-
|R&B/Hip-Hop Singles Artist of the Year
|
|-
|rowspan="2"|Female R&B/Hip-Hop Artist of the Year
|
|-
|2005
|
|-
|rowspan="2"|2011
|Top R&B Artist
|
|-
||"Un-thinkable (I'm Ready)"
|Top R&B Song
|
|-
|rowspan="3"|2013
||Alicia Keys
|Top R&B Artist
|
|-
||"Girl On Fire"
|Top R&B Song
|
|-
||Girl on Fire
|Top R&B Album
|

Billboard Latin Music Awards
The Billboard Latin Music Awards reflect the performance of recordings on the Hot Latin Songs. Keys has been nominated three times and has won one award.

|-
| style="text-align:center;" rowspan="3"| 2010 ||rowspan="2"| Alicia Keys || Crossover Artist of the Year || 
|-
| Crossover Artist of the Year, Solo|| 
|-
|| "Looking for Paradise" || Hot Latin Song of the Year, Vocal Event||

Billboard R&B/Hip-Hop Awards
The Billboard R&B/Hip-Hop Awards reflect the performance of recordings on the Hot R&B/Hip-Hop Songs and Hot Rap Tracks. Keys has won six awards.

|-
|rowspan="6"|2002
|Songs in A Minor
|Top R&B/Hip-Hop Album
|
|-
|rowspan="5"|Alicia Keys
|Top R&B/Hip-Hop Artist
|
|-
|Top R&B/Hip-Hop Artist, Female
|
|-
|Top R&B/Hip-Hop Artist, New
|
|-
|R&B/Hip-Hop Albums Artist
|
|-
|R&B/Hip-Hop Songwriter of the Year
|
|-
|rowspan="5"|2004
|The Diary of Alicia Keys
|Top R&B/Hip-Hop Album
|
|-
|rowspan="3"|Alicia Keys
|Top R&B/Hip-Hop Artist
|
|-
|Top R&B/Hip-Hop Artist, Female
|
|-
|Top R&B/Hip-Hop Albums Artist
|
|-
|"You Don't Know My Name"
|rowspan="2"|Top R&B/Hip-Hop Single
|
|-
|rowspan="6"|2005
|rowspan="2"|"Diary"
|
|-
|Top R&B/Hip-Hop Single, Airplay
|
|-
|rowspan="5"|Alicia Keys
|Top R&B/Hip-Hop Artist, Female
|
|-
|Top R&B/Hip-Hop Singles Artist
|
|-
|Top Songwriter
|
|-
|Top Producer
|
|-
|2006
|R&B/Hip-Hop Artist, Female
|

BET

BET Awards
The BET Awards annually celebrate African Americans and other minorities in music, acting, sports, and other fields of entertainment. Keys has won seven awards from fifteen nominations.

|-
|rowspan="3"|2002
|rowspan="2"|Alicia Keys
|Best New Artist
|
|-
|Best Female R&B Artist
|
|-
|"Fallin'"
|Viewers' Choice Award
|
|-
|rowspan="2"|2004
|"You Don't Know My Name"
|Video of the Year
|
|-
|rowspan="2"|Alicia Keys
|rowspan="2"|Best Female R&B Artist
|
|-
|rowspan="2"|2005
|
|-
|"My Boo"
|Best Collaboration
|
|-
|rowspan="3"|2008
|"Like You'll Never See Me Again"
|Video of the Year
|
|-
|Alicia Keys
|Best Female R&B Artist
|
|-
|"No One"
|Viewers' Choice Award
|
|-
|2009
|rowspan="3"|Alicia Keys
|Humanitarian Award
|
|-
|rowspan="5"|2010
|Artist of the Decade
|
|-
|Best Female R&B Artist
|
|-
|rowspan="3"|"Empire State of Mind"
|Viewers' Choice Award
|
|-
|Video of the Year
|
|-
|Best Collaboration
|
|-
|2013
|Alicia Keys
|Best Female R&B/Pop Artist
|
|-
|2019
|"Raise a Man" 
|rowspan="2"|BET Her
|
|-
|2020
|"Underdog" 
|

BETJ Virtual Awards
The BETJ Virtual Awards is an annual awards ceremony to recognize jazz musicians. Keys has won one award from three nominations.

|-
|rowspan="3"|2008
|"Teenage Love Affair"
|Song of the Year
|
|-
|As I Am
|Album of the Year
|
|-
|Alicia Keys
|Female Artist of the Year
|

BET Hip Hop Awards
The BET Hip Hop Awards is an award show celebrating hip-hop performers, producers and music video directors. Keys has won two awards.

|-
||2006
|"Ghetto Story Chapter 2"
|Best Collaboration
|
|-
|rowspan="2"|2010
|rowspan="2"|"Empire State of Mind"
|Best Hip Hop Video
|
|-
|Perfect Combo Award
|

BET Honors
BET Honors is an award show, which celebrates the lives and achievements of African American luminaries. Keys has won one award.

|-
|2008
|Alicia Keys
|Entertainment Award
|

BET Pre-Awards
The BET Pre-Awards celebrate African Americans and other minorities in music, acting, sports, and other fields of entertainment. These annually presented awards are presented before the BET Awards and broadcast live on BET. Keys has won two awards.

|-
|rowspan="2"|2008
|"Teenage Love Affair"
|Best Acting in a Video – Drama Kings & Queens
|
|-
|"Like You'll Never See Me Again"
|Best Action in a Video – Hip-Hop Action
|

Black Girls Rock!
Black Girls Rock! is an award show, which honors and empowers women of color around the world in many different fields. Keys has received one award.

|-
|2012
|Alicia Keys
|Rock Star
|

Black Reel Awards
The Black Reel Awards annually recognize and celebrate the achievements of black people in feature, independent and television films. Keys has received four nominations.

|-
||2007
|"People Get Ready"
|Best Song, Original or Adapted
|
|-
|2014
|"Queen of the Field (Patsey's Song)"
|rowspan="3|Outstanding Original Song
|
|-
|2015
|"It's on Again"
|
|-
|2017
|"Back to Life"
|

BMI Awards

BMI London Pop Awards

|-
|2003
|"Gangsta Lovin'"
|Urban Award
|

BMI Urban Awards

|-
|2003
|"Gangsta Lovin'"
|Award Winning Song
|
|-
|2005
|"You Don't Know My Name"
|Award Winning Song
|
|-
|2007
|"Unbreakable"
|Award Winning Song
|
|-
|2010
|"Empire State of Mind"
|Most Performed Urban Song of the Year
|
|-
|2011
|"Try Sleeping with a Broken Heart"
|Award Winning Song
|
|-
|2011
|"Un-Thinkable (I'm Ready)"
|Award Winning Song
|
|-
|2013
|"Girl on Fire"
|Most Performed Song
|

BT Digital Music Awards
The BT Digital Music Awards are held annually in the United Kingdom. Keys has received one nomination.

|-
|2010
|Alicia Keys
|Best International Artist or Group
|

BRAVO OTTO Awards (Hungary)
Keys has received one nomination.

|-
|rowspan="2"|2010
|"Empire State of Mind"
|Az év klipje
|

Brit Awards
The Brit Awards are the British Phonographic Industry's annual pop music awards. Keys has been nominated ten times.

|-
|rowspan="2"|2002
|Alicia Keys
|International Female Solo Artist
|rowspan=10 
|-
|Songs in A Minor
|International Album
|-
|rowspan="2"|2003
|Alicia Keys
|International Female Solo Artist
|-
|Songs in A Minor
|International Album
|-
|2004
|rowspan="6"|Alicia Keys
|rowspan="6"|International Female Solo Artist
|-
|2005
|-
|2008
|-
|2011
|-
|2013
|-
|2018

British LGBT Awards

|-
|2022
|Alicia Keys
|Celebrity Ally Award
|

Capital FM Awards
The Capital FM Awards is an awards show in the United Kingdom held by the radio station Capital that recognizes music releases from local and international artists. Keys has received one nomination.

|-
|2011
|Alicia Keys
|Best International Female
|

Cayman Island Premier's Awards

|-
|2009
|Alicia Keys
|Cayman Island Premier's Award for the Arts
|

Celebs Gone Good Awards
Keys has received two nominations.

|-
|2015
|rowspan="2" |Alicia Keys
|rowspan="2" |Top Celeb
|
|-
|2016
|

CMT Music Awards
The CMT Music Awards is an annual ceremony dedicated exclusively to honor country music videos. Keys has received one nomination.

|-
|2017
|"80s Mercedes" (with Maren Morris)
|CMT Performance of the Year
|

Critics' Choice Movie Awards
The Critics' Choice Movie Awards are bestowed annually by the Broadcast Film Critics Association to honor the finest in cinematic achievement. Keys has received one nomination.

|-
|2008
|"Another Way to Die"
|Best Song
|

Directors Guild of America Awards
The Directors Guild of America Awards are issued annually by the Directors Guild of America. Keys has been nominated once.

|-
|2011
|Alicia Keys
|Directors Guild of America Award for Outstanding Directing – Television Film|Outstanding Directorial Achievement in Movies for Television and Mini-Series
|

DVF Awards
The DVF Awards are held to recognize and support women who are using their resources, commitment and visibility to transform the lives of other women. Keys has received one award.

|-
|2014
|Alicia Keys
|Inspiration Award
|

ECHO Awards
The ECHO Awards are an annual German music award ceremony that recognizes outstanding achievement in the music industry. Keys has won one award from two nominations.

|-
|rowspan="2"|2002
|rowspan="2"|Alicia Keys
|Best International Newcomer
|
|-
|Best International Female Artist
|

Edison Awards
The Edison Music Award is an annual Dutch music prize, awarded for outstanding achievements in the music industry. Keys has won one award from six nominations.

|-
|rowspan="4"| 2002
| "Fallin'"
| Single Van Het Jaar
| 
|-
|rowspan="3"| Alicia Keys for Songs in A Minor
| R&B HipHop
| 
|-
| Niuwe Artiest/Groep Internationaal
| 
|-
|rowspan="2"| Zangeres Internationaal
| 
|-
| 2004
| Alicia Keys for The Diary of Alicia Keys
| 
|-
| 2006
| Unplugged
| DVD Internationaal
| 
|-

Essence Awards
The Essence Awards celebrate the achievements of prominent African Americans. Keys has received one award.

|-
|2002
|Alicia Keys
|Rising Star
|

EMMA Awards
The Ethnic Multicultural Media Academy promote diversity within the media industry by publicly recognizing the levels of excellence achieved by the multicultural community, and the qualities that each ethnic group brings to the professional and commercial success of the United Kingdom

|-
|2002 
|Alicia Keys
|International Music Act
|

Fonogram Awards
Fonogram Awards is the national music awards of Hungary, held every year since 1992 and promoted by Mahasz.

!Ref.
|-
|2003
|Songs In A Minor
| Rap or Hip-Hop Album of the Year 
|
|
|-
| 2021
| Alicia
| Best Foreign Pop Album
| 
|

GLAMOUR Magazine Women of the Year Awards

|-
|2004
|Alicia Keys
|Woman of the Year
|

Grammy Awards
The Grammy Awards are awarded annually by the National Academy of Recording Arts and Sciences. Keys has won fifteen awards from twenty-nine nominations, including Album of the Year, Record of the Year, Song of the Year and Best New Artist, she won the last two.

|-
|rowspan="6"|2002
|Alicia Keys
|Best New Artist
|
|-
|rowspan="4"|"Fallin'"
|Record of the Year
|
|-
|Song of the Year
|
|-
|Best Female R&B Vocal Performance
|
|-
|Best R&B Song
|
|-
|Songs in A Minor
|rowspan="2"|Best R&B Album
|
|-
|rowspan="8"|2005
|rowspan="2"|The Diary of Alicia Keys
|
|-
|Album of the Year
|
|-
|rowspan="2"|"If I Ain't Got You"
| Song of the Year
|
|-
| Best Female R&B Vocal Performance
|
|-
|"Diary" (with Tony! Toni! Toné!)
|rowspan="2"|Best R&B Performance by a Duo or Group with Vocals
|
|-
|rowspan="2"|"My Boo" (with Usher)
|
|-
| rowspan="3"|Best R&B Song
|
|-
|"You Don't Know My Name"
|
|-
|rowspan="5"|2006
|rowspan="2"|"Unbreakable"
|
|-
| Best Female R&B Vocal Performance
|
|-
|"If This World Were Mine" (with Jermaine Paul)
| Best R&B Performance by a Duo or Group with Vocals
|
|-
|"If I Was Your Woman"
|Best Traditional R&B Vocal Performance
|
|-
|Unplugged
| Best R&B Album
|
|-
|rowspan="2"|2008
|rowspan="2"|"No One"
| Best R&B Song
|
|-
| rowspan="2"|Best Female R&B Vocal Performance
|
|-
|rowspan="3"|2009
|"Superwoman"
|
|-
|"Lesson Learned" (with John Mayer)
|Best Pop Collaboration with Vocals
|
|-
|"Another Way to Die" (with Jack White)
|Best Short Form Music Video
|
|-
|rowspan="3"|2011
|rowspan="3"|"Empire State of Mind" (with Jay-Z)
| Record of the Year
|
|-
|Best Rap/Sung Collaboration
|
|-
|Best Rap Song
|
|-
||2014
|Girl on Fire
| Best R&B Album
|
|-
|2015
|Girl (as featured artist)
|Album of the Year
|
|-
|2022
|"A Beautiful Noise" (with Brandi Carlile)
|Song of the Year
|

GRAMMYs on the Hill Awards

|-
|2015
|Alicia Keys
|Recording Artists' Coalition Award
|

Groovevolt Music and Fashion Awards

|-
|2005
|"If I Ain't Got You"
|Song of the Year
|

Guinness World Records
The Guinness World Records is a reference book published annually, listing world records and national records, both of human achievements and the extremes of the natural world.

Harlem School of the Arts Awards

|-
|2015
|Alicia Keys
|Visionary Artist Award
|

Hollywood Film Awards

|-
|2008
|Alicia Keys / the cast of The Secret Life of Bees
|Hollywood Ensemble Acting of the Year Award
|

Hungarian Music Awards
The Hungarian Music Awards are handed out annually by the Hungarian Recording Industry Association. Keys has received two nominations.

|-
|2003
|Songs in A Minor
| Rap or Hip-Hop Album of the Year
|
|-
|2011
|The Element of Freedom
| Modern Pop-Rock Album of the Year
|

IFPI Hong Kong Top Sales Music Awards
The IFPIHKG Awards are held annually in Hong Kong to honor every year's best-selling artists. Keys has received one award.

|-
|2004
|The Diary of Alicia Keys
|Ten Best Sales Releases, Foreign
|
|-

iHeartRadio Music Awards

|-
|2019 
|Alicia Keys
|Innovator Award
|
|-
|2020 
|"Calma"  
|Latin Pop/Urban Song of the Year
|
|-

International Dance Music Awards
The International Dance Music Awards recognizes achievements in the electronic dance music industry. Keys has received three nominations.

|-
|2008
|"No One"
|Best R&B/Urban Dance Track
|
|-
|2010
|"Empire State of Mind"
|Best Hip Hop Dance Track
|
|-
|2013
|"Girl on Fire"
|Best R&B/Urban Dance Track
|

Italian Music Awards
The Italian Music Awards are held to recognize the achievements in the Italian music industry both by domestic and international artists. Keys has been nominated twice.

|-
|rowspan="2"|2002
|rowspan="2"|Alicia Keys
|Miglior Artista Femminile Internazionale
|
|-
|Miglior Rivelazione Internazionale
|

Kora Awards
The Kora Awards are music awards given annually for musical achievement in sub-Saharan Africa. Keys has won two awards.

|-
|2002
|rowspan="3"|Alicia Keys
|Best African American Diaspora Artist
|
|-
|2008
|Meilleur Artiste ou Groupe Diaspora Afrique / Amerique
|
|-
|2010
|Best African-American Artist of the Diaspora
|

La Chanson de l'Année
La Chanson de l'année (Song of the Year in English) is a French awards ceremony. Keys has received one nomination.

|-
|2012
|"Girl on Fire"
|Song of the Year
|

Meteor Music Awards
The Meteor Music Awards are the national music awards of Ireland, established by mobile telecommunications company Meteor. Keys has received one nomination.

|-
|2006
|Alicia Keys
|Best International Female
|

MOBO Awards
The MOBO Awards are held annually in the United Kingdom to recognize artists of any race or nationality performing music of black origin. Keys has won one award from ten nominations.

|-
|rowspan="4"|2002
|"Fallin'"
|Best Single
|
|-
|Songs In A Minor
|Best Album
|
|-
|rowspan="3"|Alicia Keys
|Best R&B Act
|
|-
|Best Newcomer
|
|-
|rowspan="2"|2004
|Best R&B Act
|
|-
|The Diary of Alicia Keys
|Best Album
|
|-
|2006
|rowspan="2"|Alicia Keys
|Best International Female
|
|-
|rowspan="2"|2008
|Best International Act
|
|-
|As I Am
|Best Album
|
|-
|2010
|Alicia Keys
|Best International Act
|

MP3 Music Awards
The MP3 Music Awards are held to honour the most popular artists and the best mp3 players and mp3 retailers. Keys has been nominated three times.

|-
|rowspan="2"|2010
|"Empire State of Mind"
|The HRR Award
|
|-
|"Try Sleeping with a Broken Heart"
|The BFV Award
|
|-
|2014
|"We Are Here"
|The JSB Award
|

MTV Awards

MTV Africa Music Awards
The MTV Africa Music Awards, established in 2008, are an annual awards ceremony celebrate the most popular music in Africa. Keys has won one award.

|-
|2008
|Alicia Keys
|Best R&B
|

MTV Asia Awards
The MTV Asia Awards was annual Asian awards ceremony established by the MTV television network. Keys has received two nominations.

|-
|2002
|rowspan="2"|Alicia Keys
|Favorite Breakthrough Artist
|
|-
|2005
|Favorite Female Artist
|

MTV Europe Music Awards
The MTV Europe Music Awards is an event presented by MTV Networks Europe which awards prizes to musicians and performers. Keys has won three awards from ten nominations.

|-
|2002
|rowspan="6"|Alicia Keys
|Best R&B
|
|-
|rowspan="2"|2004
|Best Female
|
|-
|Best R&B
|
|-
|rowspan="2"|2005
|Best Female
|
|-
|Best R&B
|
|-
|rowspan="2"|2008
|Ultimate Urban
|
|-
|As I Am
|Album of the Year
|
|-
|2013
|Alicia Keys
|Best World Stage Performance
|
|-
|2014
|"We Are Here"
|Best Song with a Message
|
|-
|2015
|Alicia Keys
|Best World Stage Performance
|

MTV Video Music Awards
The MTV Video Music Awards were established in 1984 by MTV to celebrate the top music videos of the year. Keys has won four awards from twelve nominations.

|-
|rowspan="2"|2001
|rowspan="2"|"Fallin'"
|Best New Artist in a Video
|
|-
|MTV2 Award
|
|-
|rowspan="2"|2002
|rowspan="2"|"A Woman's Worth"
|Best R&B Video
|
|-
|Best Cinematography in a Video
|
|-
|rowspan="3"|2004
|rowspan="2"|"If I Ain't Got You"
|Best Female Video
|
|-
|Best R&B Video
|
|-
|"You Don't Know My Name"
|Best Art Direction in a Video
|
|-
|rowspan="2"|2005
|"Karma"
|rowspan="2"|Best R&B Video
|
|-
|"My Boo"
|
|-
|rowspan="2"|2010
|rowspan="2"|"Empire State of Mind"
|Best Collaboration
|
|-
|Best Cinematography
|
|-
|2019
|"Raise a Man"
|Best R&B
|
|-
|2020
|"Underdog"
|Best R&B
|

MTV Video Music Awards Japan
The MTV Video Music Awards Japan is the Japanese version of the MTV Video Music Awards. Keys has received fourteen nominations.

|-
|rowspan="2"|2002
|rowspan="2"|Alicia Keys
|Best New Artist
|
|-
|Best R&B
|
|-
|2003
|"Gangsta Lovin'"
|Best Collaboration
|
|-
|2004
|"You Don't Know My Name"
|rowspan="2"|Best R&B Video
|
|-
|rowspan="2"|2005
|"If I Ain't Got You"
|
|-
|"My Boo"
|Best Collaboration
|
|-
|2008
|"No One"
|Best Female Video
|
|-
|2009
|"Another Way to Die"
|Best Video from a Film
|
|-
|rowspan="4"|2010
|rowspan="2"|"Doesn't Mean Anything"
|Video of the Year
|
|-
|Best R&B Video
|
|-
|rowspan="2"|"Empire State of Mind"
|Best Hip Hop Video
|
|-
|Best Collaboration
|
|-
|rowspan="2"|2013
|rowspan="2"|"Girl on Fire"
|Best Female Video
|
|-
|Best R&B Video
|

MTV Video Play Awards
MTV Video Play Awards are held to celebrate the most played music videos across the global MTV network. Keys has received two awards.

|-
|rowspan="2"|2010
|"Empire State of Mind"
|Platinum
|
|-
|"Try Sleeping with a Broken Heart"
|Gold
|

mtvU Woodie Awards
The mtvU Woodie Awards is an award show that recognizes music and artists voted best by college students. Keys has received four nominations.

|-
|rowspan="2"|2005
|"Karma"
|rowspan="2"|Streaming Woodie
|
|-
|"My Boo"
|
|-
||2007
|rowspan="2"|Alicia Keys
|Good Woodie
|
|-
||2009
|Good Woodie – Keep A Child Alive
|

MuchMusic Video Awards
The MuchMusic Video Awards is an annual awards ceremony presented by the Canadian music video channel MuchMusic. Keys has been nominated twice.

|-
|2008
|"No One"
|Best International Video – Artist
|
|-
|2010
|"Empire State of Mind"
|International Video of the Year – Artist
|

Music Choice Video on Demand Awards

|-
|2008
|"No One"
|Most Demanded Video of the Year
|

My VH1 Music Awards
The My VH1 Music Awards was an annual music award ceremony held by American television network VH1. Keys has won two award from five nominations.

|-
|rowspan="5"| 2001
| "Fallin'"
| Damn I Wish I Wrote That! (Song of the Year)
| 
|-
| Alicia Keys
| My Favorite Female
| 
|-
| Songs in A Minor
| Must Have Album
| 
|-
| All Star Tribute: "What's Going On"
| There's no "I" in "team" (Best Collaboration)
| 
|-
| Alicia Keys
| Welcome to the Big Time!
| 
|-

NAACP Image Awards
The NAACP Image Awards is an award presented annually by the American National Association for the Advancement of Colored People to honor outstanding people of color in film, television, music and literature. Keys has won seventeen awards from thirty-eight nominations.

|-
|rowspan="7"|2002
|Alicia Keys
|Outstanding New Artist
|
|-
|Songs in A Minor
|Outstanding Album
|
|-
|"A Woman's Worth"
|Outstanding Song
|
|-
|"Fallin'"
|Outstanding Song
|
|-
|Alicia Keys
|Outstanding Female Artist
|
|-
|"Fallin'"
|Outstanding Music Video
|
|-
|The 2001 MTV Video Music Awards
|Outstanding Performance in a Variety Series/Special
|
|-
|rowspan="2"|2005
|rowspan="2"|"If I Ain't Got You
|Outstanding Music Video
|
|-
|Outstanding Song
|
|-
|rowspan="4"|2006
|Alicia Keys
|Outstanding Female Artist
|
|-
|rowspan="2"|"Unbreakable"
|Outstanding Song
|
|-
|Outstanding Music Video
|
|-
|Unplugged
|Outstanding Album
|
|-
|rowspan="4"|2008
|Alicia Keys
|Outstanding Female Artist
|
|-
|rowspan="2"|"Like You'll Never See Me Again"
|Outstanding Music Video
|
|-
|Outstanding Song
|
|-
|As I Am
|Outstanding Album
|
|-
|rowspan="4"|2009
|Alicia Keys
|Outstanding Female Artist
|
|-
|rowspan="2"|"Superwoman"
|Outstanding Music Video
|
|-
|Outstanding Song
|
|-
|The Secret Life of Bees
|Outstanding Supporting Actress in a Motion Picture
|
|-
|rowspan="5"|2010
|Alicia Keys
|Outstanding Female Artist
|
|-
|rowspan="2"| "Empire State of Mind"
|Outstanding Duo, Group or Collaboration
|
|-
|Outstanding Song
|
|-
|"Try Sleeping with a Broken Heart"
|Outstanding Music Video
|
|-
|The Element of Freedom
|Outstanding Album
|
|-
|2011
|"Un-thinkable (I'm Ready)"
|Outstanding Music Video
|
|-
|rowspan="3"|2013
|Alicia Keys
|Outstanding Female Artist
|
|-
|"Girl on Fire"
|Outstanding Music Video
|
|-
|Girl On Fire
|Outstanding Music Album
|
|-
|rowspan="3"|2014
|rowspan="3"|"Fire We Make"
|Outstanding Duo, Group or Collaboration
|
|-
|Outstanding Music Video
|
|-
|Outstanding Song
|
|-
|rowspan="2"|2015
|Alicia Keys
|Outstanding Female Artist
|
|-
|"We Are Here"
|Outstanding Song
|
|-
|rowspan="3"|2017
|Alicia Keys
|Outstanding Female Artist
|
|-
|"Blended Family"
|Outstanding Duo, Group or Collaboration
|
|-
|"In Common"
|Outstanding Music Video
|
|-
|rowspan="1"|2020
|"Show me Love"
|Outstanding Duo, Group or Collaboration
|
|-
|rowspan="4"|2021
|Alicia Keys 
|Outstanding Female Artist 
|
|-
|Alicia
|Outstanding Album 
|
|-
|"Jill Scott"
|Outstanding Duo, Group or Collaboration (Traditional) 
|
|-
|"So Done" 
|Outstanding Duo, Group or Collaboration (Contemporary) 
|
|-

New York Music Awards
The New York Music Awards celebrates New York-born-and-raised and NY-based/NY-identified artists and their recordings. Keys has received two awards.

|-
|rowspan="2"|2010
|"Try Sleeping with a Broken Heart"
|Best R&B Single
|
|-
|Alicia Keys
|Best R&B Songwriter
|

News and Documentary Emmy Awards
The News and Documentary Emmy Awards are part of the extensive range of Emmy Awards for artistic and technical merit for the American television industry. Bestowed by the National Academy of Television Arts and Sciences (NATAS), the News & Documentary Emmys are presented in recognition of excellence in American news and documentary programming.

|-
| rowspan="2"| 2022
| rowspan="2"| A Choice of Weapons: Inspired by Gordon Parks
| Best Documentary
| 
|-
| Outstanding Arts and Culture Documentary
| 
|-

Nickelodeon Kids' Choice Awards
The Nickelodeon Kids' Choice Awards is an annual awards showthat honors the year's biggest television, movie, and music acts, as voted by Nickelodeon viewers. Keys has been nominated five times.

|-
|rowspan="2"|2005
|"My Boo"
|Favorite Song
|
|-
|rowspan="4"|Alicia Keys
|rowspan="4"|Favorite Female Singer
|
|-
|2006
|
|-
|2008
|
|-
|2009
|

NME Awards
The NME Awards is a music awards show hosted by music magazine NME. Keys has been nominated once.

|-
| 2002 || Alicia Keys || Best R&B Act || 
|-

NRJ Music Awards
A major Award Ceremony that takes place in cannes, France.

|-
||2005
||The Diary of Alicia Keys
|International Album of the Year
| 
|-
|rowspan=2|2005
||Alicia Keys & Usher
|Best Collaboration
| 
|-
|rowspan=2|Alicia Keys
|rowspan=2|Best International Female
| 
|-
|2008
| 
|-
|rowspan="2"|2010
|"Empire State of Mind" (ft. Jay-Z) 
|Best Collaboration Internationale
|
|-
|rowspan=2|Alicia Keys
|rowspan=2|Best International Female
|
|-
|2013
|
|-
|rowspan =2|2019
|Alicia Keys & Pedro Capó 
|Best International Duo/Group 
|
|-
|"Calma" (ft. Pedro Capó) 
|Best International Song
|

NRJ Radio Awards

|-
|2002
|Alicia Keys
|Best New International Artist
|

O Music Awards
The O Music Awards is an awards show presented by Viacom to honor music, technology and intersection between the two. Keys has received one nomination.

|-
|2013
|Alicia Keys
|Most Inspiring Fan Outreach
|

People's Choice Awards
The People's Choice Awards is an annual awards show recognizing the people and the work of popular culture. Keys has won two awards from nine nominations.

|-
|2005
|rowspan="2"|Alicia Keys
|rowspan="2"|Favorite Female Musical Performer
|
|-
|rowspan="4"|2009
|
|-
|"No One"
|Favorite R&B Song
|
|-
|"Another Way to Die"
|Favorite Song from a Soundtrack
|
|-
|Favorite Star 35 & Under
|Alicia Keys
|
|-
|rowspan="2"|2010
|rowspan="2"|Alicia Keys
|Best R&B Artist
|
|-
|Favorite Online Sensation
|
|-
|2012
|rowspan="2"|Alicia Keys
|rowspan="2"|Favorite R&B Artist
|
|-
|2013
|

Pop Awards
The Pop Awards are presented annually by Pop Magazine. Alicia Keys has one win from two nominations.

|-
|rowspan="2"|2021
|Alicia Keys
|Artist of the Year Award
|
|-
|"Underdog"
|Music Video of the Year Award
|

Premios 40 Principales Music Awards
Premios 40 Principales is an annual Spanish award show by the musical radio station Los 40 Principales. Keys has won one award.

|-
| rowspan="2"|2008
| Alicia Keys
| Best Non-Spanish International Artist
| 
|-
| "No One"
| Best Non-Spanish International Song
| 
|-
| 2010
| "Looking for Paradise"
| Best Song
| 
|-
| rowspan="2"| 2012
| rowspan="2"| Alicia Keys
| Best Non-Spanish International Artist
| 
|-
| Best American Singer-Songwriter Of The Last Decade
|

Premio Lo Nuestro
Premios Lo Nuestro is an awards show honoring the best of Latin music, presented by television network Univision. Keys has been nominated once.

|-
|2011
|"Looking for Paradise"
|Collaboration of the Year
|

Premios Ondas
Premios Ondas are given to recognize professionals in the fields of radio and television broadcasting, the cinema, and the music industry. Keys has won two awards.

|-
|2007
|Alicia Keys
|Mención Especial del Jurado
|
|-
|2010
|"Looking for Paradise"
|Mejor canción
|

Premios Oye!
Premios Oye! awards are presented annually by the Academia Nacional de la Música en México for outstanding achievements in Mexican record industry. Keys has received four nominations.

|-
|2002
|Alicia Keys
|Revelación del Año
|
|-
|rowspan="2"|2008
|As I Am
|General Inglés/Álbum del año
|
|-
|"No One"
|General Inglés/Canción del año
|
|-
|2010
|The Element of Freedom
|General Inglés/Album del Año
|

Primetime Emmy Awards
The Primetime Emmy Award is an American accolade bestowed by the Academy of Television Arts & Sciences in recognition of excellence in American primetime television programming, were first held in 1949 at the Hollywood Athletic Club.

|-
| 2019
| 61st Annual Grammy Awards
| Primetime Emmy Award for Outstanding Variety Special (Live)
| 
|-
| 2021
| American Masters
| Outstanding Documentary or Nonfiction Series
| 
|-

Producers Guild of America Awards
The Producers Guild of America's "Digital 25" awards program recognizes individuals or teams who have made exceptional contributions to the advancement of digital entertainment and storytelling. Keys has won one award.

|-
|2011
|Alicia Keys
|Digital 25: Leaders in Emerging Entertainment
|

Professional Performing Arts School Awards

|-
||2011
|Alicia Keys
|The first PPAS Alumni Outstanding Achievement
|

Record of the Year
The Record of the Year is an award voted by the UK public. Keys has been nominated once.

|-
||2010
|"Empire State of Mind (Part II) Broken Down"
|Record of the Year
|

RTHK International Pop Poll Awards
The RTHK International Pop Poll Awards is an annual award show in Hong Kong that honors the best in international and national music. Keys has won two awards.

|-
|rowspan="3"|2011
|"Empire State of Mind"
|rowspan="2"|Top Ten International Gold Songs
|
|-
|"Put It in a Love Song"
|
|-
|Alicia Keys
|Top Female Artist
|
|-
|rowspan="2"|2013
|"Girl on Fire"
|Top Ten International Gold Songs
|
|-
|Alicia Keys
|Top Female Artist
|

Satellite Awards
The Satellite Awards are an annual award given by the International Press Academy. Keys has won one award.

|-
|2008
|"Another Way to Die"
|Best Original Song
|

Shorty Awards

|-
|2016
|Alicia Keys
|Musician
|

Songwriter's Hall of Fame Awards
The Songwriter's Hall of Fame Awards celebrates established songwriters. Keys has received one award.

|-
|2005
|Alicia Keys
|Hal David Starlight Award
|

Soul Train Awards

Soul Train Music Awards
The Soul Train Music Awards is an annual award show that honors the best in African American music and entertainment. Keys has won nine awards from eighteen nominations.

|-
|rowspan="5"|2002
|"Fallin'"
|Best R&B/Soul Single, Female
|
|-
|rowspan="2"|Songs in A Minor
|Best R&B/Soul Album, Female
|
|-
|R&B/Soul or Rap Album of the Year
|
|-
|rowspan="2"|Alicia Keys
|Best R&B/Soul or Rap New Artist
|
|-
|Entertainer of the Year
|
|-
|2004
|"You Don't Know My Name"
|rowspan="2"|Best R&B/Soul Single, Female
|
|-
|rowspan="3"|2005
|"If I Ain't Got You"
|
|-
|"My Boo"
|Best R&B/Soul Single by a Duo or Group
|
|-
|The Diary of Alicia Keys
|Best R&B/ Soul Album, Female
|
|-
|2006
|"Unbreakable"
|Best Female R&B/Soul Single
|
|-
|rowspan="4"|2010
|The Element of Freedom
|Album of the Year
|
|-
|rowspan="2"|"Un-Thinkable (I'm Ready)"
|Song of the Year
|
|-
|Record of the Year
|
|-
|rowspan="2"|Alicia Keys
|rowspan="2"|Best R&B/Soul Female Artist
|
|-
|rowspan="3"|2013
|
|-
|rowspan="2"|"Fire We Make"
|The Ashford and Simpson Songwriter's Award
|
|-
|Best Collaboration
|
|-
|2016
|Alicia Keys
|Best R&B/Soul Female Artist
|
|-
|2019
| "Raise a Man"
|Video of the Year
|
|-
|2020
|Alicia Keys
|Best R&B/Soul Female Artist
|
|-
|2021
|Alicia Keys
|Best R&B/Soul Female Artist
|

Soul Train Lady of Soul Awards
The Soul Train Lady of Soul Awards is an awards show that honors the accomplishments of women in the music industry. Keys has won two awards from seven nominations.

|-
|rowspan="2"|2001
|"Fallin'"
|Best R&B/Soul Single, Solo
|
|-
|Alicia Keys
|Best R&B/Soul or Rap New Artist, Solo
|
|-
|rowspan="3"|2002
|"A Woman's Worth"
|Best R&B/Soul Single, Solo
|
|-
|Songs in A Minor
|R&B/Soul Album of the Year, Solo Artist
|
|-
|"Fallin'"
|R&B/Soul or Rap Song of the Year
|
|-
|rowspan="2"|2005
|"Karma"
|Best R&B/Soul Single, Solo
|
|-
|"If I Ain't Got You"
|R&B/Soul or Rap Song of the Year
|

Source Hip-Hop Music Awards
Source Hip-Hop Music Awards are presented by the hip hop magazine The Source. Keys has won one award.

|-
|2004
|Alicia Keys
|R&B Artist of the Year
|

Spin Magazine Reader's Poll

|-
|2002
|Alicia Keys
|Best Solo Artist
|

Swiss Music Awards
The Swiss Music Awards is an award show that honors national and international musicians. Keys has won one award.

|-
|2008
|As I Am
|Best Foreign Urban Album
|
|-
|2011
|The Element of Freedom
|Best Foreign Urban Album
|

TEC Awards
The TEC Awards is an annual award show recognizing the achievements of audio professionals. Keys has been nominated five times.

|-
|rowspan="2"| 2002
| "Fallin'"
| Outstanding Creative Achievement – Record Production/Single or Track
| 
|-
| Songs in A Minor
| Outstanding Creative Achievement – Record Production/Album
| 
|-
| 2008
| "No One"
| Outstanding Creative Achievement – Record Production/Single or Track
| 
|-
| 2011
| "Empire State of Mind"
| Outstanding Creative Achievement – Record Production/Single
| 
|-
| 2013
| Girl on Fire
| Outstanding Creative Achievement – Record Production/Album
| 
|-

Teen Choice Awards
The Teen Choice Awards is an awards show presented annually by the Fox Broadcasting Company. Keys has been nominated eleven times.

|-
|rowspan="4"|2002
|Songs in A Minor
|Choice Album
|
|-
|"Fallin'"
|Choice Single
|
|-
|Alicia Keys
|Choice Female Artist
|
|-
|"Gangsta Lovin'" Eve feat. Alicia Keys
|Choice Hook Up
|

|-
|rowspan="3"|2005
|The Diary of Alicia Keys
|Choice Album
|
|-
|rowspan="2"|Alicia Keys
|Choice Female Artist
|
|-
|Choice R&B Artist
|
|-
|2008
|"No One"
|Choice Love Song
|
|-
|rowspan="2"|2010
|Alicia Keys
|Choice Music: R&B Artist
|
|-
|The Element of Freedom
|Choice Album
|
|-
|2013
|Alicia Keys
|Choice R&B Artist
|

The Recording Academy New York Chapter honors

|-
|2007
|Alicia Keys
|New York Chapter's Recording Academy Honors
|

TMF Awards (Netherlands)
Keys has won one award.

|-
|rowspan="2"|2005
|Alicia Keys
|Internationaal/Beste Urban
|
|-
|Usher & Alicia Keys
|Internationaal/Beste Videoclip
|

TRL Awards
The TRL Awards are presented by MTV Italy to celebrate the most popular artists and music videos in Italy. Keys has received one nomination.

|-
|2008
|Alicia Keys
|First Lady
|

UK Music Video Awards

|-
|2017
|Alicia Keys in Paris - A Take Away Show
|Best Live Session
|

Vibe Awards
The Vibe Awards are an annual award ceremony that honor hip hop, R&B and soul musicians. Keys has won two awards from four nominations.

|-
|rowspan="4"|2004
|Alicia Keys
|Artist of the Year
|
|-
|"If I Ain't Got You"
|Reelest Video
|
|-
|Alicia Keys
|R&B Voice of the Year
|
|-
|"If I Ain't Got You"
|Best R&B Song
|

VIVA Comet Awards
The VIVA Comet Awards is a German pop music award ceremony, presented by the television channel VIVA. Keys has been nominated once.

|-
|2002
|Alicia Keys
|Newcomer International
|

Webby Awards
The Webby Awards is an annual award show for excellence on the Internet presented by the International Academy of Digital Arts and Sciences.

|-
|rowspan="2"|2014
|rowspan="2"|Greater than AIDS: Alicia Keys for Empowered
|Public Service and Activism
|
|-
|People's Voice Award
|

Woodie King Jr.'s New Federal Theatre Award
In commemoration of the 40th anniversary of the Woodie King Jr.'s New Federal Theatre, special awards were given to people who have changed the cultural life of the United States. Alicia Keys was one of the recipients.

|-
| 2011 || Alicia Keys || Special Award || 
|-

World Music Awards
The World Music Awards is an international awards show that annually honors musicians based on their worldwide sales figures, which are provided by the International Federation of the Phonographic Industry. Keys has won three awards.

|-
|2002
|rowspan="5"|Alicia Keys
|Best-Selling R&B/Hip Hop Artist
|
|-
|2004
|Best Selling R&B Artist
|
|-
|2008
|Best Selling R&B Female
|
|-
|2010
|Best R&B Artist
|
|-
|2014
|World's Best Live Act
|

Unite4:Humanity Awards

|-
|2014
|Alicia Keys
|Music Visionary Award
|

References

Awards
Keys, Alicia